Triztán Vindtorn (31 July 1942 – 4 March 2009), born Kjell Erik Larsen, was a Norwegian poet and performance artist from Drammen. He made his literary debut with the poetry collection Sentrifuge in 1970.

His latest collections were Jeg kan høre din hånd synge (I can hear your hand sing, 2007), and Sirkus for usynlige elefanter (Circus for invisible elephants, 2008).

Personal life
Kjell Erik Larsen's parents were cabinetmaker Asle Larsen and Åse Hafnor Kristiansen. He was married twice, first to Mona Kari Svendsrud and later to Britt Undis Knudsen. He changed his last name to Vindtorn, and signed his first books Kjell Erik Vindtorn. In 1999 he changed his first name to Triztán, after the name of a favorite pub at Ibiza, where he lived periodically.

Professional life
Vindtorn was a sailor from 1961 to 1962. He was educated as textile engineer, and worked in this profession from 1969 to 1970. He worked as a light technician at Det Norske Teatret from 1969 to 1972, and at Oslo Nye Teater from 1971 to 1981. From his literary debut in 1970 he issued almost thirty collections of poetry, all with eccentric titles. His poetry and performances were influenced by futurism, dadaism, surrealism, expressionism and pop art. He was regarded as one of Norway's most distinctive poets. His poetry is full of figurative language, puns and neologisms. In a lengthy article in the literary magazine Vinduet in 1978 Arild Linneberg analyses the reception of Vindtorn's first seven poetry collections by the literary critic. He starts by stating that Vindtorn has been called the only real surrealist among the contemporary Norwegian poets, and later in the article he also gives a detailed analysis of the poem "Kystline" ("Shoreline") from Versjoner i feberpels (Versions in fever pelt, 1975).

As a performance artist Vindtorn performed at the Molde International Jazz Festival, Vossajazz and the Roskilde Festival. In the visual arts he created works using screen-printing technique.

He was a board member of Oslo Nye Teater, and the Norwegian Authors' Union.

Vindtorn was awarded the Aschehoug Prize in 1982, and the Dobloug Prize in 1991.

Selected works
1970 Sentrifuge 
1973 Med solbriller i tunnelen 
1974 Froskemannskoret 
1975 Versjoner i feberpels 
1976 Barbeinte skyskrapere 
1977 Koden til muskelskapet 
1978 Hamrende vaffelhjerter 
1979 Huset gråt mye som barn 
1980 Trafikklys for elver 
1981 I vingenes fotspor 
1983 Vokt Dem for huden
1984 Duften av kompassroser 
1988 Det nedbrente luftslott 
1990 Til deg som søv burt dine draumar
1991 Vindblomster fra den innerste esken 
1992 Hvit hegre over silkeveien
1993 Som sunket i orda
1994 Dannebrog i mitt langbente hjerte
1996 Mellom barken og verden
1998 Hodet er den eneste trekronen som vokser inn i himmelen 
2003 Å skjøte en regnbue
2005 Skriften bak speilet
2006 Slik trær føder barn
2007 Jeg kan høre din hånd synge
2008 Sirkus for usynlige elefanter

References

1942 births
2009 deaths
People from Drammen
21st-century Norwegian poets
Norwegian male poets
Dobloug Prize winners
20th-century Norwegian poets
20th-century Norwegian male writers
21st-century Norwegian male writers